Lancaster Gordon (born June 24, 1962) is a retired American  professional basketball player who was selected by the Los Angeles Clippers in the first round (8th pick overall) of the 1984 NBA draft. A 6'3" guard from the University of Louisville, Gordon was selected as the Most Valuable Player in the 1983 NCAA Mideast Regional, and went on to play four NBA seasons for the Clippers from 1984 to 1988. In his career, Gordon played in 201 games and scored a total of 1,125 points.  Gordon also played parts of three seasons in the Continental Basketball Association from 1988 to 1991.  He averaged 8.2 points per game in 39 games for the Pensacola Tornados, La Crosse Catbirds and Sioux Falls Skyforce.

Gordon is a member of the University of Louisville Athletics Hall of Fame.

NBA career statistics

Regular season 

|-
| align="left" | 1984–85
| align="left" | L.A. Clippers
| 63 || 1 || 10.8 || .383 || .222 || .755 || 1.0 || 1.4 || .5 || .1 || 4.1
|-
| align="left" | 1985–86
| align="left" | L.A. Clippers
| 60 || 1 || 11.7 || .377 || .250 || .804 || 1.1 || 1.0 || .6 || .2 || 5.2
|-
| align="left" | 1986–87
| align="left" | L.A. Clippers
| 70 || 4 || 16.1 || .406 || .292 || .737 || 1.8 || 2.0 || .9 || .2 || 7.5
|-
| align="left" | 1987–88
| align="left" | L.A. Clippers
| 8 || 0 || 8.1 || .355 || .000 || 1.000 || 0.5 || 0.9 || .1 || .3 || 3.5
|-
| align="left" | Career
| align="left" | 
| 201 || 6 || 12.8 || .391 || .271 || .767 || 1.3 || 1.5 || 0.6 || 0.2 || 5.6

References

External links
Basketballreference.com page

1962 births
Living people
African-American basketball players
American men's basketball players
Basketball players from Jackson, Mississippi
La Crosse Catbirds players
Los Angeles Clippers draft picks
Los Angeles Clippers players
Louisville Cardinals men's basketball players
Pensacola Tornados (1986–1991) players
Point guards
Sioux Falls Skyforce (CBA) players
21st-century African-American people
20th-century African-American sportspeople